Ushpayacua is a genus of parasitic flies in the family Tachinidae. There is one described species in Ushpayacua, U. ureophila.

References

Dexiinae
Taxa named by Charles Henry Tyler Townsend
Diptera of South America
Monotypic Brachycera genera
Tachinidae genera